Mirwais Naziri (date of birth unknown) is a right-handed batsman and medium pace bowler who played for the Afghanistan national cricket team.

Naziri was a member of Afghanistan's 2009 ICC World Cricket League Division Three winning squad. Naziri made his debut for Afghanistan in the tournament against Hong Kong Naziri played 4 matches during the tournament, with his final appearance to date for Afghanistan coming against the Cayman Islands.

References

Living people
Afghan cricketers
Year of birth missing (living people)